Bat Out of Hell: The Musical (promoted as Jim Steinman's Bat Out of Hell: The Musical) is a rock musical with music, lyrics and book by Jim Steinman, based on the Bat Out of Hell album by Meat Loaf. Steinman wrote all of the songs, most of which are from the Bat Out of Hell trilogy of albums (Bat Out of Hell, Bat Out of Hell II: Back into Hell, and Bat Out of Hell III: The Monster Is Loose). The musical is a loose retelling of Peter Pan, set in post-apocalyptic Manhattan (now named 'Obsidian'), and follows Strat, the forever young leader of 'The Lost' who has fallen in love with Raven, daughter of Falco, the tyrannical ruler of Obsidian. Steinman has said in interviews that a version of the Peter Pan story inspired some of the songs on the 1977 album Bat Out of Hell, and that is the connection between this musical and the 1977 album. Before the album Bat Out of Hell was released, Steinman worked on a musical of that storyline that was called "Neverland" at the time.

The musical premiered at the Manchester Opera House in Manchester, England, on February 17, 2017 and ran there until April 29, 2017. The production was directed by Jay Scheib and choreographed by Emma Portner. It was produced by David Sonenberg, Michael Cohl, Randy Lennox and Tony Smith. The show originally starred Andrew Polec as Strat and Christina Bennington as Raven, with Rob Fowler as Falco and Sharon Sexton as Sloane.

The show opened in London on June 5, 2017 and ran there until August 22, 2017 before moving to Toronto, from October 14, to January 7, 2018. The musical returned to London at the Dominion Theatre on April 2, 2018. An original cast recording album was released by BOOH Label on October 20, 2017.

It is currently (as of 2023) on an International Tour (UK, Ireland, Germany and Australia). The show is due to return to London's West End at the Peacock Theatre in 2023.

Background 
In 1968, while at Amherst College, Jim Steinman wrote a newspaper article about the contemporary issues of the time, then decided to turn that into a rock musical called The Dream Engine, working with fellow student Barry Keating, who became the show's director. The Dream Engine starred Steinman as Baal, the charismatic 19-year-old leader of a tribe of semi-feral youths in California, and showed Baal's interactions with tribe members and recruits (inductions involving pain rituals) and various adult authority figures (the chief of police, a draft board representative, a psychiatrist, and killer nuns). Staging was very much influenced by Bertolt Brecht and The Living Theatre. It also contained the song "Who Needs The Young" and the "Hot Summer Nights" speech, which are in Bat Out Of Hell: The Musical.

Rights to The Dream Engine were bought by Joseph Papp of the New York Shakespeare Festival in April 1969, and upon his graduation that summer, Steinman was recruited to refine his work for larger productions, but these productions never took shape. By 1973, Papp moved Steinman from The Dream Engine and put him to work on the rock musical More Than You Deserve, where Steinman met the actor and singer Meat Loaf. In August 1974, Steinman wrote to Papp to say he had rewritten much of The Dream Engine and it was now a musical called Neverland. Throughout 1975, Meat Loaf, Steinman, Ellen Foley, and others worked on the National Lampoon Road Show, substituting for John Belushi and Gilda Radner who had left to work on Saturday Night Live. During this time, Steinman wrote most of the songs for the album Bat Out of Hell and began to rehearse and record them with Meat Loaf and Foley.

In early 1977, Steinman went to Washington, D.C. to work on a workshop production of Neverland, which had many of the core elements of The Dream Engine, but was now a futuristic sci-fi interpretation of Peter Pan. Foley starred as Wendy. In September 1977, Bat Out of Hell was released.

In the late 1990s, Neverland was rewritten into a film script called Bat Out of Hell 2100, including earlier songs by Steinman such as "Who Needs The Young", "All Revved Up With No Place To Go", and the song "Bat Out Of Hell", "It's All Coming Back to Me Now", "Objects In The Rear View Mirror", and "I'd Do Anything For Love". It draws more from the Peter Pan story, with characters including Peter, Wendy, Police Chief Captain Hook, Doctor Darling, and Mother Superior.

In 2008, Bat Out Of Hell: The Musical was announced. In 2015 a developmental lab for the show took place in New York, and in late 2016 a cast was assembled for the first public production, in the U.K.

Plot

Act One
Act One begins with Strat recalling his first encounter with rock and roll ("Love and Death and an American Guitar (Strat's Soliloquy)") before his DNA froze causing him to remain eighteen forever (in the 21/22 UK tour this is performed by Raven). The story is set in the dystopian city of Obsidian, once known as Manhattan. Strat and his friends who are also frozen like him: Tink, Blake, Ledoux, Jagwire, Zahara and other teens call themselves 'The Lost' protest in Falco Square outside Falco Towers ("All Revved Up with No Place to Go" / "Wasted Youth"), the residence of the tyrannical leader of Obsidian, Falco. During the scuffle, Strat's shirt is torn from his back and thrown to the ground. Falco's only teenage daughter, Raven, sneaks outside and is drawn to the discarded shirt. Picking it up, her eyes meet with Strat, but she is immediately rushed back inside by her mother and Falco's wife, Sloane. Falco himself joins the fight, throwing Tink to the ground as he was spraying graffiti on the wall of Falco Towers, so Ledoux breaks a bottle over Falco's head, giving him a facial injury.

Falco eventually drives 'The Lost' away, and returns home to Falco Towers, where Raven expresses her resentment towards him for forbidding her from ever going outside. After sending Raven to bed, Falco discusses with Sloane about how he wants to make Obsidian great again with his planned house project. However, this involves: destroying disused tunnels and subways which have become residential areas for the homeless community and 'The Lost'. They then talk about the teenagers today while lamenting their long gone youths ("Who Needs the Young?"). In her room, Raven is trying on Strat's shirt when Strat briefly climbs in and he quickly steals a magazine with her image on it. His presence startles her, but he disappears quickly just as Sloane arrives. Raven eagerly asks Sloane about 'The Lost', so her mother tells her: a chemical warfare and an earthquake occurred in this city 25 years ago. Those teenagers were trapped in a tunnel filled with poison which didn't kill them, but froze their genes causing them to remain eighteen forever. Sloane then gives Raven an early eighteenth birthday present; Falco's old biker jacket. She also encourages her to not make the mistakes she made and that she wants her to be free and to be able to fall in love.

The following day, 'The Lost' are gathered in an area of Obsidian which they call the Deep End. It is their hideaway, which is located in a disused subway tunnel nearby the 81st Street–Museum of Natural History station. Strat's best friend, Tink crashes his bicycle, then acts aggressively towards Jagwire - but the fight is stopped from escalating by Strat, who takes Tink aside, tends his wounds and tussles with him. Unbeknownst to Strat, Tink secretly has a crush on him and attempts to kiss him, but Strat pulls back. Zahara discusses Falco's house project and she also attempts to make a move on Strat which he pulls back on as well. He asks Zahara: 'on a hot summer night, would you offer your throat to the wolf with the red roses?', but this falls flat, and both Zahara and Strat are a little alienated by each other.

As Zahara leaves, she tells Strat that he needs to give up and forget about Raven, but Strat refuses. As he expresses his desire to see Raven; Blake, Ledoux, Tink and 'The Lost' briefly discuss kidnapping her in exchange for ransom. They then encourage him to pursue her romantically ("Out of the Frying Pan And Into the Fire").

Meanwhile, Jagwire pulls up on his motorbike outside of Falco Towers, after seeing Zahara there. It is briefly established that they have an ongoing unromantic relationship which is going sour. Zahara accuses Jagwire of following her and attempts to drive him away, but Jagwire persists to get his feelings through to her. Although she is aware of Jagwire's love for her, Zahara gently rejects him as she still cannot get over her first love ("Two Out of Three Ain't Bad").

Within Falco Towers, Falco and Sloane throw a party for Raven to celebrate her eighteenth birthday, much to her chagrin. Raven once again asks her father to let her explore the subways and to hang out with 'The Lost' which he bluntly and firmly refuses. Sloane attempts to brighten up the atmosphere by reminding everyone that it is Raven's birthday, but it quickly devolves into Falco and Sloane making out while reminiscing about how they got together during their wild-and-free youth ("Paradise by the Dashboard Light"). This causes Raven to leave in frustration and disgust.

In her room, Raven tearfully rips up her family photos until Falco and Sloane enter. They apologize for embarrassing her on her birthday and Zahara appears in a nurse outfit. Zahara gives Raven 'dream suppressant' medication, while Falco and Sloane tuck her into bed. Once they leave the room, Strat sneaks in through the window, and his presence soon awakens Raven, who is initially startled. Strat asks her: 'on a hot summer night, would you offer your throat to the wolf with the red roses?', but she's too busy expressing other feelings to notice the question, which disappoints Strat - who begins to leave, but she stops him. They have a heart-to-heart talk; Strat tells Raven what life is like being a 'Lost', and Raven reveals that she can never dream due to Falco making her take 'dream suppressant' medication. This leads them to serenade each other ("Making Love Out of Nothing at All") and Strat invites her to go out with him for one night. Raven agrees to go with him and just as they are about to make love, a frantic Zahara interrupts by entering the bedroom to warn them that Falco is coming, and has already invaded the Deep End. Strat then grabs Raven and they escape via her bedroom window. Outside, they are met up with Jagwire who appears with Strat's motorbike and he urges them to go just as he gets apprehended by Falco's militia. Strat takes Raven on his motorbike and they begin their escape, but Raven has second thoughts about going with him ("Bat Out of Hell"). Halfway through the ride, Raven starts fearing about what her father would do to Strat, prompting her to jump off his motorbike and run away, leaving Strat to grab the handlebars, brake and stop. Devastated and hurt, he gets back on his motorbike and zooms ahead. Strat ends up driving his motorbike at full speed, off the Atlantic Ocean cliffs when he 'misses' a sudden curve. His motorbike shatters and crushes him, severely injuring and seemingly killing him.

Act One ends with Zahara and Tink discovering his body. Zahara climbs down from the top of the cliffs and she calls the paramedics who arrive to help her carry Strat away.

Act Two
As Zahara briefly mentioned before Strat and Raven escaped, Falco was invading the Deep End. At the start of Act Two, Falco has captured many members of 'The Lost' and has confined them in 'The Vaults Of Punishment' (a cage barely big enough to hold them all) in the prison basement of Falco Towers. Falco gleefully tortures Jagwire by electrocution and Zahara appears in her nurse outfit while holding Strat's bloodied shirt. She grimly informs 'The Lost' that Strat has died just as Raven and Sloane arrive. Raven breaks down upon hearing this and is dragged away by Zahara and Sloane, leaving Falco and his militia to torture 'The Lost' ("In the Land of the Pig, the Butcher Is King"). Up in her room, Raven mourns over Strat's death ("Heaven Can Wait"). Below, 'The Lost' are still shocked to have lost their leader and they all admit that their lives are a mess - but then, their lives have always been a mess - prompting Jagwire, Blake and Ledoux to share their pasts ("Objects in the Rear View Mirror May Appear Closer Than They Are"). Having had enough of Falco's tyrannical behaviour, Sloane sneaks into the basement and frees 'The Lost' from the cage, allowing them to escape.

In the 21/22 UK Tour, In The Land of Pig is cut; instead, Falco walks into the living room holding Strat's shirt, Raven gets mad and accuses him of killing Strat and runs to her room. Sloane tries to ask what happened and Falco says he warned Raven what would happen if she hung out with them. Then we transition into ("Heaven Can Wait") Objects is instead sung in the Deep End between Jagwire, Valkyrie, and Ledoux.

Meanwhile, Zahara takes a pint of blood from Raven and wakes her up. She tells Raven to come with her and they leave. Unbeknownst to them, Tink has been hiding in the room behind the door, and in a fit of jealousy, he violently rips into the pillows on Raven's bed - sending feathers flying everywhere - before throwing his knife at her photo. Zahara takes Raven to the safe area (script says: the attic of the Natural History Museum, but this is depicted on stage as an area filled with rocks), where she and Tink have been secretly looking after Strat who had miraculously survived his accident. She transfuses Raven's blood into Strat, enabling him to become mobile again, and he stumbles down from the rocks reciting poetry ("Teenager In Love"). Raven is shocked and overjoyed to see Strat and attempts to thank Tink for saving him, but he rudely rebuffs her. Zahara forcibly makes Tink leave with her while Strat and Raven have a heartfelt reunion ("For Crying Out Loud").

The following day, Zahara returns to Falco Towers to prepare a bag for Raven and is confronted by Falco who violently demands her to reveal Raven's location. She denies knowing where Raven is and Falco reveals that he knows that she is actually part of 'The Lost'. Sloane enters the room and she defends Zahara from Falco. She attempts to talk some sense into Falco, but he pushes her away prompting her to yell that she is leaving him. Falco is about to strike Sloane until Zahara fires two warning shots with her gun. She beckons Sloane to come with her - so they can both leave in safety.

At the museum, Strat once again asks Raven: 'on a hot summer night, would you offer your throat to the wolf with the red roses?' Raven responds to his words and happily agrees to become his, just as 'The Lost' show up. 'The Lost' become shocked and overwhelmed to see Strat alive. They joyously welcome him 'back from the dead' while serenading him with Raven ("You Took the Words Right Out Of My Mouth (Hot Summer Night)"). A 'wedding' is held - 'The Lost' dress Strat in a ruffled shirt with a sparkly silver jacket, and they dress Raven in a white dress, accompanied by a bouquet. Sloane joins in the celebration and she accepts Strat as Raven's partner. Raven throws the bouquet over her shoulder - this is caught by Zahara, who is simultaneously overjoyed and freaked out to catch it, so she throws it again - where it is caught by a female Lost member - Scherzzo(Or Valkyrie In The 21/22 UK Tour) - who gets down on one knee and proposes to Sloane.

After the 'wedding', Strat and Raven go to the Dunes where they talk - Raven reveals she is now able to dream for the first time - and they attempt to consummate their relationship. They are soon interrupted by a jealous Tink who urges Strat to send Raven back to Falco. Strat refuses, leading into a heated argument and Tink vows to get rid of Raven while lamenting his unrequited love for Strat ("Not Allowed to Love"). At Falco Towers, Falco unsuccessfully tries to dissuade Sloane from leaving him after losing Raven ("What Part of My Body Hurts the Most"), and he is left all alone to reflect on his actions. He is later visited by Tink who offers him a deal: he will take him to where Raven is, in exchange that no one gets hurt and that he will leave 'The Lost' alone after he gets Raven back. Falco becomes convinced and he agrees to the deal while amused by Tink's betrayal.

In the Deep End, 'The Lost' are gathered at the bar continuing to celebrate the union between Strat and Raven while Jagwire serenades Zahara ("Dead Ringer For Love"). Their celebration is interrupted when Falco bursts in through the wall with his militia and Tink. He reveals the deal he and Tink made and orders 'The Lost' to return Raven to him if they want him to leave them alone. Everyone resists and a scuffle ensues, which abruptly ends when Falco accidentally and unintentionally shoots Tink. Overwhelmed with shock and anger, Strat orders Raven to get away from him, prompting her to run off - heartbroken. Weak from blood loss, Tink apologizes for what he did because he only wanted to remain as they always were and Strat forgives him, telling him that he will always be his best friend and his soulmate. Tink dies in Strat's arms and 'The Lost' hold a funeral for him ("Rock and Roll Dreams Come Through"). Meanwhile, Raven is left with no choice but to return home to Falco Towers where she furiously blames her father for ruining everything.

Note: In the 2021/22 UK Tour, the book is changed so that Tink is only injured; he survives.

Six months later, Sloane is still wandering through the city, delivering a beautiful monologue about how she's tried and failed to recapture her youth. In Falco Towers, Raven has become a recluse by secluding herself in her bedroom until Strat slips in through the window. He apologizes for spurning her six months ago when he knew it wasn't her fault Tink died and that he still loves her. Realizing she is still in love with Strat, Raven rekindles her feelings for him, and so does Sloane when she returns to Falco to rekindle their marriage ("It's All Coming Back to Me Now"). Raven suddenly has second thoughts about their relationship, because after being apart for so long, she has realized that they cannot be together. When Strat asks her why, she reveals that unlike him, she is not frozen. Thus, she will age normally while he remains young forever. Strat tells Raven that he doesn't care if she gets old, because she will always be eighteen in his eyes and he will always love her no matter what.

Finale: Strat and Raven, Falco and Sloane, and Zahara and Jagwire make vows to their respective partners ("I'd Do Anything For Love (But I Won't Do That)"). During this song, Falco is forced at gunpoint into a lake by Zahara, where he emerges several seconds later dressed in a different outfit (a baptism/redemption). [In the US tour, during the song 'The Lost' surround Falco and when they disperse, he is wearing a rock style outfit.]
Note: In the 21/22 UK Tour, Tink comes back for the finale, as he did not die and was merely injured, and he hugs Raven.

Major characters 
 Strat: the eccentric and forever eighteen-year-old leader of 'The Lost', a group of teenagers whose DNA froze at eighteen causing them to remain young forever. He falls in love with Falco's daughter, Raven. He and 'The Lost' live in abandoned subway tunnels below the city of Obsidian.
 Raven: Falco's only daughter, who turns eighteen during the course of the story. She lives with her parents in a skyscraper in Obsidian called Falco Towers. She is an heiress to Falco's fortune but resents her family, particularly her father for forbidding her from ever going outside. She falls in love with Strat. However, since her DNA is not frozen, she will age normally.
 Falco: a powerful tyrant and CEO of Falco Industries, and the father of Raven. He has his own private militia, which he often sends out to battle 'The Lost'. He is very protective of Raven to the extent where he forbids her from ever going outside. He particularly despises Strat, seeing him as a threat for wanting to approach his daughter.
 Sloane: Falco's wife and the mother of Raven. She is a hilarious drunk, but also harbors a lot of regret in her life and spends much of the story pushing herself to break free from Falco as he becomes increasingly tyrannical and violent. Projecting her feelings about her own situation towards her daughter, she wants Raven to be free and to be able to fall in love.
 Tink: Strat's best friend and a fellow member of 'The Lost'. He is romantically in love with Strat, but cannot act upon this because his DNA is frozen at a younger developmental age than the rest of 'The Lost' and as such is considered a child by his peers. He resents Raven; the romance between Strat and Raven is interpreted by Tink as Raven taking Strat away from himself and 'The Lost', rather than as Strat taking Raven from her family.
 Zahara: Strat's friend and Jagwire's love interest who leads a double life; working as a nurse at Falco Towers and being part of 'The Lost'. She resents Falco but feels protective towards Raven and Sloane. 
 Jagwire: Strat's friend and a fellow member of 'The Lost' who is in love with Zahara. 
 Ledoux: Strat's friend and a fellow member of 'The Lost' who is a close friend of Tink. 
 Blake: Strat's friend and a fellow member of 'The Lost' who is a close friend of Ledoux. For the 2018 North American tour and onward, this character was retired from the show.
Valkyrie: another member of The Lost - up until the 2018 tour version of the show, she was a background ensemble character closely associated with Blake, but in more recent versions of the show, she has become a more prominent character; flirting with Zahara, singing Blake's verse in "Objects In The Rear View Mirror...", and spontaneously proposing marriage to Sloane during "You Took The Words Right Out Of My Mouth".

Casts

Major cast replacements

Dominion Theatre, London (2018–19) 

Strat: Jordan Luke Gage took over the role from Andrew Polec on September 4, 2018, after previously covering it as Alternate, while also appearing in the ensemble as Hoffman. Gage was replaced as both Hoffman and as second cover Strat by Barney Wilkinson.
Ledoux: Giovanni Spanó took a break from the production on September 29, 2018 to compete on the 2018 series of The X Factor, then did not return until December 26 due to suffering from Special Bronchitis. During this time, the role of Ledoux was covered by Sam Toland (1st cover), Eric Hallengren (2nd cover), and Olly Dobson (emergency cover, who previously covered the role as part of the 2017 cast). Toland also played Ledoux for the final performance of this production on the evening of January 5, 2019.

Metronom Theater, Oberhausen (2018–19) 

 Sloane: Franziska Schuster, previously the walk-in-cover for the role took over from Willemijn Verkaik on April 3, 2019.

New York City Centre (2019) 

Ledoux: On July 17, 2019, 15 days before opening, Billy Lewis Jr. announced that he was joining the New York cast as Ledoux. He had previously played the role of Jagwire during various runs in US, UK and Canada. Until August 19. 2019, Will Branner played Ledoux and cover Strat, but Branner left the cast to join the tour of Mean Girls, so Lewis took over the role of Ledoux for the remainder of the run.

Creative team 
The Manchester and London productions retained the same creative team.

Musical numbers

 Act I
 "Love and Death and an American Guitar" – Strat
 "All Revved Up with No Place to Go" / "Wasted Youth" – Strat, Falco, Ledoux, Jagwire and Company
 "Who Needs the Young?" – Falco and Sloane
 "Out of the Frying Pan And Into the Fire" – Strat, Ledoux, Blake, Tink and Company
 "Two Out of Three Ain't Bad" – Zahara and Jagwire
 "Paradise by the Dashboard Light" – Falco, Sloane and Company
 "Making Love Out of Nothing at All" – Strat and Raven
 "Bat Out of Hell" – Strat, Raven and Company

 Act II
 "Heaven Can Wait" – Raven
 "Objects in the Rear View Mirror May Appear Closer Than They Are" – Jagwire, Blake, Ledoux and Company
 "For Crying Out Loud" – Strat and Raven
 "You Took the Words Right Out of My Mouth (Hot Summer Night)" – Strat, Raven, Ledoux, Liebeswoosh, Blake, Mordema, Jagwire and Company
 "Not Allowed to Love" – Tink
 "What Part of My Body Hurts the Most" – Falco and Sloane
 "Dead Ringer for Love" – Jagwire, Zahara and Company
 "Rock and Roll Dreams Come Through" – Strat, Tink, Jagwire, Ledoux, Blake, Zahara and Company
 "It's All Coming Back to Me Now" – Raven, Sloane, Falco and Strat
 "I'd Do Anything for Love (But I Won't Do That)" – Strat, Raven, Jagwire, Falco, Sloane, Zahara, Blake, Ledoux, Liebeswoosh and Company
An excerpt from the Meat Loaf recording of "Life Is A Lemon And I Want My Money Back" can be heard at the beginning of the scene in Raven's bedroom between "Who Needs the Young?" and "Out of the Frying Pan (And Into the Fire)". Lines from the title track of the album Bad for Good are used frequently in dialogue spoken by Raven, with one line also being sung as part of Sloane's monologue towards the end of act two.

"Teenager In Love" is the name of the monologue Strat recites immediately before he and Raven sing "For Crying Out Loud". Performed by Steinman, a shorter version of this piece was first released as "Shadows On The Freeway" in 1979, then as "Nocturnal Pleasure" on the 1981 album Dead Ringer. This full length version - titled "Teenager In Love" - was initially only the prologue to the music video for "It's All Coming Back to Me Now" by Pandora's Box (1989) but was later released as a stand-alone audio track on the digital-only special 19-track version of the album, which includes promotional tracks and single edits.

Changes
 Versions of "Life Is A Lemon And I Want My Money Back" and "Lost Boys and Golden Girls" were rehearsed, but never made it into a staged production.
 "Good Girls Go to Heaven (Bad Girls Go Everywhere)" (sung by Zahara, Sloane, Raven and Company) was included in the first few nights of previews in Manchester, but was cut and replaced with "Out of the Frying Pan (And Into the Fire). However, it was included on the original cast recording, and used as an encore during the 2021 UK tour.
 "It Just Won't Quit" (sung by Raven, Strat and Company) was in the show until near the end of the London Coliseum run. As with "Good Girls Go to Heaven", it was still included on the original cast recording.
 "In the Land of the Pig, the Butcher Is King" (sung by Falco and Company), and the scene it is included in, were omitted from the US Tour. As of the 2021 UK tour this song has been removed entirely.

Productions

Manchester
Bat Out of Hell began previews at the Manchester Opera House on February 17, 2017 ahead of an official opening on March 14. It closed on April 29.

Dianne Bourne of the Manchester Evening News gave the show a 5-star review, calling it 'a truly staggering piece of musical theatre, which breaks new boundaries in its staging, choreography and concept on an epic scale'. Paul Downham of North West End said, "this show has literally changed the way musicals are staged forever."

West End 2017: London Coliseum
Bat Out of Hell began previews at the London Coliseum on June 5, 2017 ahead of an official opening on June 20, 2017 and ran until August 22, 2017. On its final performance, the cast announced a return to London at the Dominion Theatre in 2018.

The London Coliseum production was nominated for a 2018 Olivier Award for Best Sound Design, by Gareth Owen.

Toronto
Bat Out of Hell made its North American premiere at the Ed Mirvish Theatre on October 14, 2017 and ran until January 7, 2018.

West End 2018 return: Dominion Theatre 
After the production completed its run in Toronto, Bat Out Of Hell's return engagement in London began previews on April 2, 2018, before opening at the Dominion Theatre on April 19, 2018. After originally being scheduled to run until July 28, 2018, the Dominion production was first extended until October 27, 2018, and subsequently extended again to January 5, 2019. The show broke box office records at the Dominion, selling £350,000 worth of tickets in its first day of sale.

In August 2018, one of the show's producers David Sonenberg was quoted in Forbes magazine as saying the show was "unbelievably profitable", and that more than 500,000 people had seen the show to that point.

North American Tour
The North American tour of Bat Out of Hell was originally scheduled to run from October 2018 through Summer 2019. The tour opened October 16, 2018 in Toronto at the Ed Mirvish Theatre, and was first scheduled to end July 7, 2019 in Dallas at the AT&T Performing Arts Center, then - after the Toronto run had begun - further dates were announced in Las Vegas and an 8-week run in New York (off-Broadway) from July 30, 2019 to September 22, 2019.

On November 1, 2018, the North American tour was postponed by producers and concluded with the scheduled end of the Toronto run on November 3, 2018. No reason for the postponing was given, and this decision was criticized by many of the tour's cast, who voiced their displeasure with the news on social media.

On November 5, 2018, an official announcement was made on social media and the show's website to say that the tour will relaunch in 2019, "ahead of a previously announced season at New York City Center." No explanation was given for the postponement. Several cast members contacted prominent theatre news website "BroadwayWorld" to say that their contracts have been terminated and they have not been approached about the 2019 tour.

Germany
Bat Out Of Hell began previews in Oberhausen at the Metronom Theater on November 2, 2018 ahead of an official opening on November 8, 2018. It closed on September 19, 2019, and was replaced by Tanz Der Vampire in October 2019.

New York
Bat Out Of Hell made its US debut off-Broadway at the New York City Center theater - August 1, 2019 to September 8, 2019. Tickets went on sale on May 15, 2019 and large billboards were seen on Times Square to promote the show. The cast announced for this run include Andrew Polec, Christina Bennington and Danielle Steers - who originated their characters for the UK productions of the show - and Bradley Dean, Avionce Hoyles, Tyrick Wiltez Jones, Harper Miles and several ensemble actors rejoin the show from the previously-aborted 2018 'US Tour'. There were changes to the creative team - Randy Lennox is no longer listed as one of the producers, with Bob Broderick and Lorne Gertner joining the list of producers. Choreography is now credited to both Emma Portner and Xena Gusthart. Ryan Cantwell is named as Musical Director. On 4 June 2019, they announced Lena Hall for the role of Sloane.

Las Vegas 
A Las Vegas production of the musical was announced in May of 2022, with the performances all taking place in the Paris Las Vegas hotel theatre. The production would premiere on September 27, 2022, with Las Vegas entertainment company BASE Entertainment managing the production.

On December 23, 2022, an internal memo was sent to members of the Las Vegas production that the musical would close on January 1, 2023 due to extreme financial troubles. The production was cancelled mid-run into its schedule, with the production only lasting 12 weeks. According to the Las Vegas Review-Journal, the show had seen "chronically low" ticket sales despite being promoted on online-seat filling sites, continuing a streak of productions that had also seen low ticket sales at the Paris Las Vegas hotel.

2020 international tours

US Hard Rock Hotels mini-tour 
The show has been announced for a series of short runs in venues under the Hard Rock Hotels & Casinos group; three US hotels with dates ranging from March to April 2020. It is stated on each press release that this is due to a new partnership between the named hotel and Nederlander Worldwide Entertainment. These shows were all postponed due to the COVID-19 pandemic.

Australian arena tour
On November 25, 2019, announcements were made of an Arena Tour version of the show for June 2020, stopping at Sydney, Brisbane, Melbourne, Adelaide, and Perth. The production has been re-branded as Jim Steinman's Bat Out Of Hell: The Rock Musical and an 'Arena Experience'. Venues and promotion are being run by Australian entertainment company TEG Dainty with the long-time promoter and company CEO Paul Dainty being quoted on press releases. These shows were initially postponed until May 2021, and later postponed again until January/February 2023. The production also had plans to tour New Zealand, but plans were later cancelled due to the Covid-19 pandemic.

UK tour 
On December 5, 2019, a UK tour in Q3-Q4 2020 and 2021 was announced to open in Manchester on 10 September 2020 but was rescheduled due to the COVID-19 pandemic. On 21 June 2021, producers confirmed the new tour dates from September 2021. The show will now open at the Manchester Opera House on 11 September 2021 before visiting Oxford, Glasgow, Birmingham, Wimbledon, Stockton, Edinburgh, Aberdeen, Stoke-on-Trent, Sheffield, Eastbourne, Milton Keynes, Southampton, Plymouth, Newcastle, Bristol, Belfast, Dublin, Hull, Cardiff, Liverpool and Woking.

The cast for US / Australia / UK 2020 was revealed on 27 February 2020, simultaneously on WhatsOnStage.com and on the official website. Returning cast were Rob Fowler and Sharon Sexton as Falco and Sloane in the UK tour, and Alex Melcher as Falco in the US and Australia. Glenn Adamson would play Strat in the US and UK, and Martha Kirby would be playing Raven in all territories. As with the North American tour and NYCC versions of the show, no one is listed in the role of Blake. There are now only 10 members of the ensemble cast - to compare, there were 26 members of the ensemble cast for the show's West End run at the Dominion Theatre.

Awards and nominations

Citations

2017 musicals
Jukebox musicals
Meat Loaf
Rock musicals
Rock operas
West End musicals
Science fiction musicals
Musicals by Jim Steinman
Works based on Peter Pan